Acoyte (Salta) is a village and rural municipality in Salta Province in northwestern Argentina.

It is found 9 kilometers west of Santa Victoria.

Seismicity 
In the Salta Province, earthquakes range from high frequency to low frequency.

References

Populated places in Salta Province